Hol Station is a disused railway station located on the Bergen Line in Hol municipality, Buskerud county, Norway. It was opened as a Passing loop with a stop in 1907 when the Bergen Railway was opened to Gulsvik Station. It was upgraded to a station in 1931. However, in 1983 the station was closed and all passengers trains do not stop  anymore. Meanwhile, the station still provides the passing loop function.

References

External links
 Hol Station in Stasjonsdatabasen (STDB)
 Unofficial introduction of Hol stasjon
 Historieboka om Hol stasjon

Railway stations on Bergensbanen
Railway stations opened in 1907
Railway stations closed in 1983